The Geiger HDP 10 is a German electric motor for powering electric aircraft, designed and produced by Geiger Engineering of Seigendorf, Hirschaid, Oberfranken.

Design and development
The HDP 10 is a brushless 58 volt design producing  at 1950 rpm, with an outrunner coil.  It has a 93% efficiency. The low working rpm of the engine means that it can turn a propeller at efficient speeds without the need for a reduction drive.

Specifications (HDP 10)

See also

References

External links

Aircraft electric engines